SPLAT! (short for an RF Signal Propagation, Loss, And Terrain analysis tool) is a GNU GPL-licensed terrestrial radio propagation model application initially written for Linux but has since been ported for Windows and OS X.  SPLAT! can use the Longley-Rice path loss and coverage prediction using the Irregular Terrain Model to predict the behaviour and reliability of radio links, and to predict path loss.

History 
Development started in 1997 by John A. Magliacane, KD2BD. The latest version 1.4.2 was published in 2014. In 2020 several authors started the development of a completely reworked version which was not published yet. The authors introduce multithreading, georeferenced outputs (GeoTIFF) and metrication as defaults.

References

External links
SPLAT! Website
Stumbleupon's review (From Wayback Machine, as StumbleUpon is defunct.)
TV Technology article

Radio frequency propagation
Free communication software
Amateur radio software for Linux
Amateur radio software for Windows
Amateur radio software for macOS